The Steam Heritage Trail is a rail trail and heritage trail that links the east and west coasts of the Isle of Man. The trail links Douglas to Peel. Sections were relaid in 2019 and 2020.

In August 2020, the Isle of Man Government,  published plans to add a spur from St John's on the heritage trail to Kirk Michael.

References

External links

Walking in the Isle of Man
Heritage trails
Douglas, Isle of Man
Peel, Isle of Man
Rail trails in the United Kingdom